Large flycatcher may refer to:
 Fatu Hiva monarch, a species of flycatcher found in French Polynesia
 African grey flycatcher, a species of flycatcher found in East Africa